"Holy Water" is a song by We the Kingdom that was released as the second single from their debut extended play, Live at the Wheelhouse (2019) and Holy Water (2020), on September 13, 2019. The song was written by Ed Cash, Scott Cash, Franni Cash, Martin Cash, and Andrew Bergthold.

"Holy Water" became We the Kingdom's debut entry on the US Hot Christian Songs chart, having peaked at No. 2. The song is also the highest-charting song of their career, having peaked at No. 6 on Billboards Bubbling Under Hot 100 chart. "Holy Water" was nominated for the GMA Dove Awards for Song of the Year and Pop/Contemporary Recorded Song of the Year and at the 2020 GMA Dove Awards. "Holy Water" has garnered a Grammy Award nomination for Best Contemporary Christian Music Performance/Song at the 2021 Grammy Awards.

Background
"Holy Water" was released by We the Kingdom on September 13, 2019, as the second single from Live at the Wheelhouse (2019), in the lead-up to its release, which was slated for October 25, 2019. Ed Cash shared the story behind the song, saying: 

An acoustic version of the song by the band was released on the Live Acoustic Sessions EP on March 6, 2020. On March 20, 2020, We the Kingdom and Tasha Cobbs Leonard released a new rendition of the song dubbed "Holy Water (Church Sessions)" as a single.

Composition
The singers' vocal range spans from C4 to C5.

Chart performance
"Holy Water" debuted on the US Christian Airplay at No. 45, on the chart dated August 27, 2019. It spent 29 weeks on the chart before reaching No. 1 on the March 14, 2020-dated chart, having attained significant gains in radio airplay. On the US Hot Christian Songs, the song made its debut at No. 31 on the chart dated September 28, 2019, following its commercial release. The song peaked at No. 2 on the February 8, 2020-dated chart, 20 weeks after its debut.

Music videos
We the Kingdom released the lyric video of "Holy Water" on September 13, 2019. The live music video of the song, recorded at Young Life Sharptop Cove in Jasper, Georgia, was released on October 1, 2019, on YouTube. An acoustic performance video of "Holy Water" at the Boiler Room at Neuhoff Site, Nashville, Tennessee, was published on YouTube on January 2, 2020. The Church Sessions video featuring Tasha Cobbs Leonard with an appearance by Maverick City Music was released on March 20, 2020.

Accolades

Track listing

Charts

Weekly charts

Year-end charts

Certifications

Release history

References

External links
  on PraiseCharts

2019 singles
We the Kingdom songs
2019 songs
Songs written by Ed Cash